This is a list of Mexican films released in 2005.

2005

External links

References

2005
Films
Mexican